Moiety may refer to:

Chemistry
 Moiety (chemistry), a part or functional group of a molecule
 Moiety conservation, conservation of a subgroup in a chemical species

Anthropology
 Moiety (kinship), either of two groups into which a society is divided
 A division of society in the Iroquois government and societal structure
 An Australian Aboriginal kinship group
 Native Hawaiian realm ruled by a moʻi or an aliʻi

Law
 Moiety title, ownership of part of a property

Entertainment
 Moiety, a 2012 album by Keith Kenniff (as Helios)
 Moiety, a rebel group in the computer game Riven